Ettefagh Synagogue is a synagogue located in the neighborhood of Tehran, Iran.

History 
After the World War II, with the installation of a new government in Iraq, the situation of the Jews in Iraq deteriorated. After prominent members of the Jewish community such as Laura Khozoee were arrested, and Shafiq Adas, a successful Jewish businessman, was hanged, many Iraqi Jews decided to emigrate. Some left for Israel while others decided to settle in Iran. They reached Iran with the help of Kurdish Jews and many arrived at Khorramshahr. With the help of Harun Abdolnabi, a prominent Jew in Khorramshahr, some were able to go to Tehran and obtain legal documents. From 1946 to 1951 many Iraqi Jews moved to Tehran, while others moved to Europe and the United States. At this time, with the help of Iranian Jews, the Iraqi Jews decided to create a cultural center.

In  1946 Meir Abdullah Batson bought a large piece of land with an area of over  near the University of Tehran, in Ghods Street. The community wanted to name the synagogue after Meir Abdullah, but the government did not accept it because he was a foreign citizen. In Persian, beh ettefagh means "together". Hence the name "Ettefagh" was chosen, and it became the main place of gathering for the Iraqi Jews of Tehran.

The synagogue architecture was designed in the style of Babylonian architecture, and it was fitted with the most advanced cooling system of the time. Most of the Torah scrolls in the synagogue were brought by the Jews who came from Iraq, and a Babylonian Talmud in Aramaic script was dedicated to the synagogue. Many Iraqi Jews emigrated from Iran during the Iranian revolution, and today only a few families (mainly Iranian Jews) still use the synagogue.

Ettefagh School 
The synagogue also had a related private high school, the Ettefagh School. In the 1970s, the school was known for the strong English-language coursework. Students from religious minority families in Iran attended the school in the 1970s, including Christian, Baha'i, and Zoroastrian. After the Iranian Revolution the school is now run by the state and is an all-girls school.

References 

Synagogues in Tehran